Shirpur Gold Refinery is India's first refinery headquartered in Mumbai. It is a green field precious metal refinery with installed capacity to refine 217 MT p.a. of gold and silver respectively in Shirpur and Dhule in the state of Maharashtra. SGRL is a Public Ltd Company with its shares listed in BSE & NSE. It is promoted by the Patel brothers of the Autoriders Group.

It is among the most advanced in the world and also owns its own airport with 24-hour landing facilities.

The refinery operates the subsidiary Zee Gold which was established in a joint venture with the Essel Group. The subsidiary has 70% shareholding rights of the Metalli Exploration And Mining (MEAM) in Mali.

References

Companies based in Mumbai
Gold in India
Metal companies of India
Indian companies established in 2001
Essel Group
2001 establishments in Maharashtra
Companies listed on the National Stock Exchange of India
Companies listed on the Bombay Stock Exchange